Sandy Hook is an unincorporated community in Goochland County, Virginia, United States. Sandy Hook has a post office with ZIP code 23153.

One version of the etymological history of the name "Sandy Hook" has it that at a prominent local bend on Route 522 (opposite what is now "Wood's Store", and probably before the road was surfaced), heavy rain would leave a silty, sandy residue on the road. At these times, the local population would refer to this bend as "the sandy hook" in giving directions.

Sandy Hook is one of the seven original villages in Goochland County.

References

Unincorporated communities in Goochland County, Virginia
Unincorporated communities in Virginia